Fluffing  can mean:
 A practice in public relations of spinning a topic to present it in the most positive light
 A fluffer is a person who prepares the actors for their participation in pornography roles
Fluffer (London Underground), a person who cleans the tunnels during the night, while the trains are not running

In film
 The Fluffer, an American film about a man hired to work as a fluffer for a gay pornographic film company

In music
 Fluffers (band), a British rock music group